Bonnie, is a Scottish given name and is sometimes used as a descriptive reference, as in the Scottish folk song, My Bonnie Lies over the Ocean. It comes from the Scots language word "bonnie" (pretty, attractive), or the French bonne (good). That is in turn derived from the Latin word "bonus" (good). The name can also be used as a pet form of Bonita.

People named Bonnie

Women
 Bonnie Bartlett (born 1929), American actress
 Bonnie Bedelia (born 1948), American actress
 Bonnie Bernstein (born 1970), American sportscaster
 Bonnie Bianco (born 1963), American singer and actress
 Bonnie Bramlett (born 1944), American singer and sometime actress
 Bonnie Crombie (born 1960), Canadian politician, formerly Member of the Canadian Parliament
 Bonnie Curtis (born 1966), American film producer
 Bonnie Dasse (born 1959), retired American track and field athlete
 Bonnie Devine (born 1952), Indigenous Canadian artist
 Bonnie Dobson (born 1940), Canadian folk music songwriter, singer, and guitarist
 Bonnie Dunbar (born 1949), retired American astronaut
 Bonnie Franklin (1944–2013), American actress
 Bonnie Fuller (born 1956), Canadian media executive
 Bonnie Gadusek (born 1963), retired American professional tennis player
 Bonnie Garland, American murder victim
 Bonnie Garmus, American author
 Bonnie Gold, American mathematician
 Bonnie Greer (born 1948), American-British playwright, novelist and critic
 Bonnie Guitar (born 1923), American Country-Pop Singer
 Bonnie Henry (born 1965/66), Provincial Health Officer for British Columbia
 Bonnie Hunt (born 1961), comedian, actress, director, producer, writer, host, and voice artist
 Bonnie Koloc (born 1946), American folk music singer-songwriter, actress, and artist
 Bonnie Langford (born 1964), British actress, dancer and entertainer 
 Bonnie Lee (1931–2006), American Chicago blues singer
 Bonnie Loo (born 1994), Singapore-based Malaysian singer-songwriter and actress
 Bonnie Lou (born 1924), American rock and roll and country music singer 
 Bonnie Lythgoe, former British dancer, theatre producer and director
 Bonnie MacBird (born 1951), American actress, playwright, screenwriter and producer
 Bonnie Mathieson (1945–2018), American scientist
 Bonnie McFarlane (born 1973), Canadian stand-up comedian and writer
 Bonnie McKee (born 1984), award-winning American singer, songwriter, and actress
 Bonnie Mealing (1912–2002), Australian freestyle and backstroke swimmer
 Bonnie Milligan, musical theater performer and television actor
 Bonnie Owens (1929–2006), American country music singer
 Bonnie Parker (1910–1934), American gangster (Bonnie and Clyde)
 Bonnie Pink (born 1973), Japanese singer, songwriter, and musician
 Bonnie Poe (1912–1993), American actress
 Bonnie Pointer (1950–2020), American R&B and disco singer (of The Pointer Sisters)
 Bonnie Raitt (born 1949), American blues singer-songwriter and slide guitar player
 Bonnie Rideout (born 1962), award-winning Scottish fiddler
 Bonnie Schneider, American television meteorologist and author
 Bonnie Shemie (born 1949), American-Canadian author and illustrator
 Bonnie Sherr Klein (born 1941), Canadian feminist filmmaker, author and disability rights activist
 Bonnie Sherk (1945–2021), American artist
 Bonnie Somerville (born 1974), American actress and singer
 Bonnie Tyler (born 1951), Welsh singer
 Bonnie Wright (born 1991), British actress, fashion model, screenwriter, director and producer
 Bonnie Zacherle (born 1946), American designer, Creator of My Little Pony toy line.

Men
 Bonnie Stewart (died 1994), professor of mathematics
 Bonnie 'Prince' Billy (b. 1970), stage name for Will Oldham
 Bonnie Prince Charlie (b.1720), also known as Prince Charles Edward Stuart

Fictional characters
 Bonnie Green, a character in The Wolves of Willoughby Chase.
 Bonnie, a character in Pokémon The Series: XY
 Bonnie, a character from The Walking Dead video games 'and television series
 Bonnie, a character in the TV show Who's the Boss?
 Bonnie, a character in the video game Brawl Stars
 Bonnie Anderson, in Toy Story
 Bonnie Brindle, a character in sitcom  Small Wonder (TV series)
 Bonnie Castle, Original Sin , played by Angelina Joile
 Bonnie Malloy, the main character of the TV series Life with Bonnie
 Bonnie McCullough, a character in the book series, The Vampire Diaries 
 Bonnie McMurray, a reoccurring character on the Canadian television sitcom Letterkenny
 Bonnie Bennett, from the television series The Vampire Diaries
 Bonnie Rockwaller, the self-proclaimed "mean girl" on the animated series Kim Possible
 Bonnie Butler, in Gone with the Wind
 Bonnie MacFarlane, a major character in Red Dead Redemption
 Bonnie Plunkett, main character in CBS sitcom Mom
 Bonnie Simpson, a character in 1989 American independent coming of age comedy movie She's Out of Control
 Bonnie Swanson, from the animated series Family Guy
 Bonnie the Bunny, a character in Five Nights at Freddy's
 Bonnie Watkins, a casual character who was Roseanne's coworker on the First Edition of the sitcom Roseanne
 Bonnie Winterbottom, a character in the TV series How to Get Away with Murder
 Bonnie from doll line and animated series Cry Babies

See also
 Bonny (disambiguation)
 Bonaventure (disambiguation)

English feminine given names
Unisex given names
Scottish unisex given names
Scottish feminine given names